Ken Yaremchuk (born January 1, 1964 in Edmonton, Alberta) is a retired professional ice hockey player who played 235 games in the National Hockey League.  He played with the Toronto Maple Leafs and Chicago Black Hawks. He also competed in the men's tournament at the 1988 Winter Olympics.

Ken is the brother of Gary Yaremchuk.

Career statistics

Regular season and playoffs

International

Awards
 WHL First All-Star Team – 1982
 WHL Second All-Star Team – 1983

Personal

Yaremchuk has two sons Nolan (Forward) and Austin (Defence) both playing for Grant MacEwan College.

References

External links 

1964 births
Living people
Canadian ice hockey centres
Canadian people of Ukrainian descent
Chicago Blackhawks draft picks
Chicago Blackhawks players
EV Zug players
Asiago Hockey 1935 players
HC Davos players
Ice hockey people from Edmonton
Milwaukee Admirals (IHL) players
National Hockey League first-round draft picks
Newmarket Saints players
Portland Winterhawks players
SC Rapperswil-Jona Lakers players
Toronto Maple Leafs players
Ice hockey people from Alberta
Canadian expatriate ice hockey players in Italy
Canadian expatriate ice hockey players in Switzerland
Olympic ice hockey players of Canada
Ice hockey players at the 1988 Winter Olympics